Poul Jørgensen (26 October 1934 – 2003) was a Danish conductor who won first prize in the International Besançon Competition for Young Conductors. He led the University Choir Lille MUKO of the University of Copenhagen.

References

External links
biography

1934 births
2003 deaths
Danish conductors (music)
Male conductors (music)
20th-century conductors (music)
20th-century Danish male musicians